BCTC may refer to:

BC Transmission Corporation, a crown corporation that transmits electricity in British Columbia, Canada
BC Treaty Commission, an independent body responsible for facilitating treaty negotiations among First Nations in BC and the governments of Canada and BC
Bluegrass Community and Technical College, a community college in Lexington, Kentucky, USA
Brooklyn Center Transit Center, a rapid bus station in Brooklyn Center, Minnesota, USA
BCTC (drug), an inhibitor of TRPV1